The Metrograph is an independent two-screen movie theater at 7 Ludlow Street in the Dimes Square neighborhood  on the Lower East Side of Manhattan. It opened in 2016 with two theatres, a bookstore, a "curated" concession stand, and a restaurant. It was founded by Alexander Olch, who is better known as a designer of men's ties.

Programming
The Metrograph screens both new films and revivals of older films. The schedule is programmed by Jake Perlin and Aliza Ma. It also occasionally hosts private events such as premieres of movies and TV shows.

History
The Metrograph initially opened in 2016. After closing in March 2020 due to COVID-19, they reopened September 1, 2021, several months after movie theaters were legally allowed to reopen in New York City on March 5, 2021.

Online
In July 2020, Metrograph launched a digital membership with live screenings and on-demand movies available to watch at home.

See also
 List of art cinemas in New York City

References

External links

Other art houses in Manhattan:
 Sun Shine Cinema (Land Mark Theaters)
 Cinema Village

2016 establishments in New York City
Cinemas and movie theaters in Manhattan
Repertory cinemas
Lower East Side